Arbogastes or Arbogast (died 8 September 394) was a Roman army officer of Frankish origin.

Early career

Arbogastes, or simply Arbogast, was the nephew of the great Frankish general Flavius Richomeres and  a native of Galatia Minor until he was expelled in the later 370s. Some modern scholars discount the claim by some ancient historians that he was the son of Bauto, Valentinian II's former magister militum and protector before Arbogast, while others accept it. John of Antioch fragment 187 is the source for Arbogast being Bauto's son, but no other ancient authority, who mentions these two, mentions that fact.

His Germanic name, Arbogastiz, is also otherwise attested; it is composed of the elements *arbija- 'inheritance' and *gastiz 'guest'.
After leaving Galatia, he took service in the army of the Western Roman Empire under Gratian, son of Valentinian I and elder brother to Valentinian II. Arbogast soon made a name for himself as an extremely efficient and loyal field-commander.  In 380 Gratian sent Arbogast, along with his magister militum Bauto, to aid Theodosius I against the Goths who had pillaged areas of Macedonia and Thessaly that year and the year before. The combined Western and Eastern armies defeated the Gothic leader Fritigern, pushing his forces out of Macedonia and Thessaly towards Thrace in lower Moesia where the raids had begun, and ultimately established a peace treaty with the Visigoths in 382. Arbogast came to be considered Gratian's principal officer, along with Mellobaudes, king of the Franks.

Threat and execution of Maximus

Magnus Maximus deposed and killed Gratian in 383,  and gained control of the Western Roman Empire after convincing Theodosius I to accept him as co-Augustus. Arbogast, apparently out of his attachment to the deceased, refused to serve under the usurper, but deserted to Theodosius, rising in his service to a position of distinction.
Four years after his rebellion (387) Maximus invaded Italy, demonstrating his ambitions of supremacy in the whole empire, which prompted the Eastern Emperor Theodosius I to gather his available armies, including the Goths, Huns, and Alans, along with his trusted commanders Arbogast and Richomeres, to quash the growing power of an aspiring rival.  The campaign against Maximus came to an end only a year later in 388 when Maximus, defeated at Poetovio by the armies of Theodosius I, fled precipitately to Aquileia where, however, he did not find safety.  The garrison was disaffected by Maximus' defeat, and he was delivered by his own soldiers to Theodosius I and executed on 28 August 388, with his head then making a tour of the provinces.  After the execution of Maximus, Arbogast, who at this time had the title of magister peditum in the West, was dispatched to Trier by Theodosius I in order to assassinate Victor, the son of Maximus and heir to the throne in the West.  This was done with ease on behalf of Arbogast and with the disposal of both Maximus and Victor, Theodosius I was able to give control over the West to Valentinian II, the younger son of Valentinian I.  At the time, however, Valentinian II was too young to rule the Western Empire from Italy on his own, so Theodosius I stayed in Italy to conduct civil and political affairs from the beginning of Valentinian II's reign in 388 until 391, when he left for Constantinople, at which time Arbogast was promoted to magister militum and left to keep an eye on the young Emperor after they were moved to Vienne.

Arbogast and Valentinian II

The controversy involving Arbogast began during the regency of Valentinian II, who soon after his recognition as Emperor by Theodosius I became a figurehead for the wiles and ambitions of Arbogast.  After being proclaimed as the only Magister Militum in Praesenti, or commander of the armies in attendance on the emperor in the Western Empire by Theodosius I, Arbogast's authority throughout the Western Provinces, mainly Gaul, Spain and Britain, seemed to be absolute, with him answering only to Theodosius I himself.  However, Arbogast was unable to claim control over those territories under his own name and had to do so in the name of Valentinian II instead because he was a barbarian by birth.  By 391, Valentinian II had already been isolated in Vienne, his status essentially reduced to that of a private citizen, and the control of the Western armies now belonged to Frankish mercenaries loyal to Arbogast. Furthermore, Valentinian's Court was also overrun by those loyal to Arbogast after Arbogast placed them in favorable positions.  During this period, Arbogast became increasingly violent towards Valentinian II and his councilors, so much so, in fact, that Arbogast is described as killing the councilor Harmonius, a friend of the Emperor who had been accused of taking bribes, at the feet of Valentinian II in 391.  At this point, Valentinian II began recognizing the extent to which Arbogast's authority had reached, and with Arbogast seemingly expressing his authority over him at will, Valentinian II began sending secret messages to both Theodosius I and Ambrose, Bishop of Milan, pleading for them to come to his aid, even so much as asking Ambrose for a baptism in fear that his death might come sooner than expected at the hands of Arbogast.

Death of Valentinian II

Tension between Arbogast and Valentinian II reached its height in 392 when Valentinian II dismissed Arbogast from his seat of power.  According to Zosimus, after receiving the order of dismissal from Valentinian II, Arbogast states "You have neither given me my command nor will you be able to take it away," and promptly threw the order to the ground and walked out.  Soon after this encounter, Arbogast and Valentinian II met again in the palace of the Emperor and began a discussion which soon escalated into a confrontation between the two, ultimately resulting in Valentinian's attempt to stab Arbogast with a sword belonging to the man-at-arms beside him, which was prevented by the latter.  Whether or not the account of Philostorgius is true, shortly afterward on May 15, 392, Valentinian II was found hanged in his sleeping quarters with suicide claimed as the cause of death by Arbogast.  According to Ambrose of Milan, the body of Valentinian II was sent by Arbogast to Milan for a proper funeral, and four months later in August 392, Arbogast nominated Eugenius, a Roman teacher of rhetoric, as the next emperor in the West.

Debate about the death of Valentinian II

Although the ancient historians were unanimous in stating Arbogast's claimed innocence about the death of Valentinian II, some of them could not agree on whether or not his claim was true.  Historians such as Zosimus, Philostorgius, Socrates Scholasticus, and Paulus Orosius, all believed Valentinian II was murdered, one way or the other, by Arbogast.  On the other hand, more contemporary scholars, such as Edward Gibbon, thought the death of Valentinian II was a plotted conspiracy so Arbogast could remain at the seat of command in the West through another puppet emperor, while John Frederick Matthews, and Brian Croke argue that the death of Valentinian II was a result of suicide.  Croke, for example, argues that given the period of four months time between the death of Valentinian II and the promotion of Eugenius was sufficient enough for him to appear innocent, implying that if Arbogast had plotted an assassination, Arbogast would have installed a replacement for Valentinian II almost immediately.

Furthermore, Gerard Friell describes Valentinian II as being humiliated after his authority was devalued by Arbogast on multiple occasions and seemingly cites depression as the main cause of suicide for Valentinian II. Bishop Ambrose, on the other hand, claims that the death of Valentinian II was a result over a dispute between him and Arbogast involving diplomacy and who would lead the armies into Italy in an attempt to defend it from invading forces from the Balkans. Additionally, it has also been suggested that Arbogast, a man with pagan influences, was attempting to revive the paganism efforts in Rome by electing Eugenius, who is believed to have been sympathetic towards Paganism, although himself a Christian.  However, the nearest historical source available regarding the death of Valentinian II, Rufinus of Aquileia, states in his ecclesiastical history that nobody was really sure what exactly happened to Valentinian II.  Because this is the case, any opinions about the event are most likely to have been fabricated by those telling the story, with new evidence seemingly unattainable.

Arbogast and Eugenius

Whether or not the rumors surrounding the death of Valentinian II are true, Eugenius nonetheless was elected as the next Emperor of the Western Roman Empire in August, 392, after a regime change that was considered "legitimate, legal, Roman, and civilized." Afterward, one of the first acts by Arbogast was to travel across the Rhine frontier in 393 CE to take revenge against his own Franks and their kinglets Sunno and Marcomer who had plundered the regions north of the Rhine during the previous year while the West was still under the rule of Valentinian II.  In launching this campaign, which was met with little opposition, Arbogast was successful in restoring the fortress city of Cologne, returning to the city its protection as a strategic location, which, at this time in 393, was the last time the Roman army would occupy the eastern bank of the Rhine River.  Furthermore, Arbogast was able to conclude a peace treaty with the Franks that provided the Roman military with fresh Frankish recruits, something that was considered a great accomplishment by Arbogast.

However, trouble for both Arbogast and Eugenius arose as the Pagan revitalization movement began during the reign of Eugenius, which may or may not have been intended by either one of them, although some, such as Zosimus, would differ.  After appealing to both Theodosius I and Ambrose as a Christian, which is perhaps the reason why the nomination of Eugenius was approved by Theodosius I in the first place, the pagan influences of Arbogast seemed to have made their way through Eugenius, as many of the pagan temples, which had previously been closed under the emperors Gratian and Valentinian II, were now opened and restored to working condition.  This, coupled with Theodosius I elevating the status of his youngest son Honorius to full Augustus in 393 effectively reduced the legitimacy of Eugenius and pushed the two camps, those of Arbogast and Eugenius and Theodosius I and Ambrose, further apart from one another.  Furthermore, with the lines of communication being fractured at best between the Eastern half of the empire and the West as a result of the promotion of Rufinus to Praetorian Prefect in the East after the death of Valentinian II, Rufinus was able to inform Theodosius I about whatever he believed to be worthy of the Emperor's attention. At this point, eager to regain their legitimacy, both Arbogast and Eugenius set off to claim Italy in support of their cause in April 393, and even so much as to threaten to turn the basilica at Milan into a stable for their horses in 394.  Eventually the influences of both Arbogast and Eugenius, along with the reappointment of Nicomachus Flavianus as the Praetorian Prefect of Italy, led to the full, and last, revival of paganism as Eugenius, albeit reluctantly due to his diminishing, yet still present Christian roots, allowed for the Altar of Victory and other pagan symbols in Italy to be restored.

Shortly after these events, Emperor Theodosius I, perhaps realizing the situation between East and West was becoming problematic at the least, began to prepare his foederati, including Germanic troops, those from the Visigothic treaty in 382 led by Alaric, as well as a contingency of Alans and Huns, for war against Arbogast and Eugenius in 394.  Given that Arbogast and Eugenius had begun openly celebrating paganism again, Theodosius I saw fit to justify his actions against Arbogast and Eugenius as a Holy War, and set off through the Julian Alps with his armies to eliminate both of his adversaries from their respective commands at the Battle of the Frigidus in 394.

Battle of the Frigidus

As the threat of war between Arbogast and Eugenius and Theodosius I became more imminent, Arbogast and Eugenius moved their collective force towards the defenses of the Julian Alps, where they made camp in Milan and were joined by Nicomachus Flavianus, who had consulted the Pagan entrails and proclaimed a future victory for the Pagan cause under the names of Eugenius and Arbogastes. Hoping to use the Julian Alps to their advantage, Arbogast and Eugenius planned to use them as the location for their series of ambushes that would, in theory, lead to the encirclement of Theodosius I and his troops. As this was being planned by his enemies, Theodosius I set off from Constantinople for war in the middle of May, reaching Adrianople on 20 June 394. However, upon arriving at Sirmium, Theodosius I took time to reinforce his troops, causing a delay in the expected arrival time of Theodosius, something Arbogast and Eugenius had been counting on for their ambush tactics.  Because of the delay, Arbogast thought as though Theodosius I was planning to outflank them by use of an amphibious assault to their south that would have come from behind the heavily defended Adriatic coast. In thinking this, Arbogast dispatched a substantial portion of his forces to the south, which proved to be a costly maneuver by Arbogast.

By the time Theodosius I reached Arbogast's location in September, after passing through the Julian Alps, he was able to see the forces of Arbogast and Eugenius in the plain below with their backs turned to the river Frigidus, firmly entrenched and ready for the battle.  Theodosius I quickly realized that the strategic elevated positions were already occupied by some of Arbogast's forces, and given that Arbogast moved a portion of his forces to the south, thus making the possibility of out-flanking Arbogast a difficult one.  With this in mind, on 5 September 394, Theodosius led his force on a frontal assault of Arbogast and his troops, with many Visigoths serving in the vanguard.  The brutal fighting lasted the entire day with Theodosius I unable to break the lines of Arbogast's forces while taking heavy losses to his barbarian troops in the process. With defeat getting near, Theodosius and his armies retreated towards the protection of the Julian Alps where Theodosius prayed to God asking him for help against his enemies. Meanwhile, at the camp of Arbogast and Eugenius, the men were celebrating what they believed to be a victory over Theodosius. At this time, Arbogast sent a considerable portion of his army to attack Theodosius I from the rear in the Alps. This did not go according to Arbogast's plan, however, and as soon as his troops came upon the camp of Theodosius I, he offered them substantial portions of money, which they agreed to relatively easily.

Theodosius, now having a greater number or troops than the previous night when they retreated, was ready to lead another attack upon the armies of Arbogast and Eugenius the following day on 6 September 394. If the substantial loss of his own troops on behalf of bribery by Theodosius I wasn't enough of an insult to Arbogast, the fate that awaited him on the second day of battle was surely enough to bring him to defeat. While Theodosius I led his troops through a narrow road leading to the valley in which the previous day's battle took place, Arbogast, Eugenius and their men attempted to ambush Theodosius I but were unsuccessful due in large part to a phenomenon known as the “Bora” that occurs in that region of the Julian Alps, resulting in a pressure effect on the cold air making its way over the mountains which produces cyclonic winds that can gust up to 60 mph.  This extreme wind, which is said to have blown in the face of Arbogast and his troops, caused them to shield their eyes from dust and also caused their projectiles to turn back whence they came, effectively minimizing the attack force of Arbogast and his troops, resulting in their defeat on behalf of Theodosius I.

Deaths of Arbogast and Eugenius

After the camp of Arbogast and Eugenius was overrun by Theodosius I, Eugenius was captured in person and pleaded to be spared. This did not come to be, however, as Eugenius met his end by means of a beheading, and was toured around the provinces much in the same way that Maximus was in 388. Arbogast, on the other hand, was able to escape the clutches of Theodosius I and fled into the Alps where he is said to have wandered alone for a couple of days before realizing how hopeless he had become and committed suicide a few days after 6 September 394 in the noble Roman fashion.

Symbolism of the battle

Christian writers such as Theodoretus and Saint Augustine saw the divine presence supposedly working in events surrounding the battle. The great winds of the "Bora," and a "solar eclipse" appear prominently in Christian accounts but a modern scholar doesn't see spiritual intervention at work but rather the significant role of the barbarian troops, the first large scale use of such troops during the reign of Theodosius.

Legacy
"Flavius Arbogastes...was a first-class military commander with a fine record, very popular with the army and wholly loyal to the houses of Valentinian and Theodosius."

"Arbogast, the flame-like Frank, was [...] no mere intriguer like Maximus, but a brave and well-trained soldier, probably the best General in the Roman Empire..."

Of Bauto and Arbogast: 
"Both men were Franks by birth, exceedingly well-disposed to the Romans, completely immune to bribes, and outstanding as regards to warfare in brain and brawn."

On succeeding Bauto: 
"To the soldiers under his command he seemed like a suitable successor, for he was brave and experienced in warfare and contemptuous of money.  And so he came to great power, such that even in the Emperor's presence he spoke quite freely, and he vetoed those actions which he thought were wrong or unbecoming...for Arbogastes was supported by the good will of all the soldiers."

See also
Roman Civil War of 394 AD
Battle of the Frigidus
Valentinian II
Theodosius I
Eugenius
Flavius Stilicho
Magnus Maximus

References

Sources

 
 

 

Rufinus. Historia Ecclesiastica. Edited by T. Mommsen. Berlin, 1903–1908.

Socrates. Historia Ecclesiastica. With introduction by W.Bright. Oxford, 1878.
Zosimus. Historia Nova, The Decline of Rome.  Translated by James Buchanan and Harold Davis.  Trinity University Press. Texas, 1967.
Burns, Thomas S. Barbarians Within the Gates of Rome: A Study of Roman Military Policy and the Barbarians, ca. 375–425 A.D. Indiana University Press, 1994.
Croke, Brian. "Arbogast and the Death of Valentinian II." Historia 25 (1976): 235–244.

Salzman, Michele Renee.  Ambrose and the Usurpation of Arbogastes and Eugenius: Reflections on Pagan-Christian Conflict Narratives.  Journal of Early Christian Studies – Volume 18, Number 2, Summer 2010, pp. 191–223.  The Johns Hopkins University Press.
Wolfram, Herwig and Dunlap, Thomas. History of the Goths. Berkeley: University of California Press, 1990.

Further reading

Potter, David. From the Tetrarch To the Theodosians: Later Roman History and Culture 284-450 CE

394 deaths
4th-century Frankish people
4th-century Romans
Ancient Roman military personnel who committed suicide
Frankish warriors
Magistri militum
Year of birth unknown